Autumn Story is the third extended play by South Korean boy band Astro. It was released by Fantagio Music on November 10, 2016 and distributed by Interpark. The EP contains 5 tracks, including the lead single, "Confession". The hidden track, called "Confession talk (고백 Talk)" is an audio message from the group members. The album is available in two versions: Red and Orange. The Red version of the album features MJ, Moonbin, and Sanha talking on the confession, while the Orange version has JinJin, Cha Eun-woo, and Rocky talking on the confession.

Track listing

Charts

Weekly

Monthly

Year-end

Sales and certifications

Release history

References

2016 EPs
Astro (South Korean band) albums
Korean-language EPs
Interpark Music EPs